The John R. Boyle House was a historic building located on the east side of Davenport, Iowa, United States. It was listed on the National Register of Historic Places in 1983, and has subsequently been torn down.

History
John R. Boyle was a railroad contractor who built sections of the Mississippi and Missouri Railroad, which became part of the Chicago, Rock Island and Pacific Railroad. He also worked on the Chicago and Northwestern Railroad and the Union Pacific Railroad. He built this house not far from the railroad tracks in 1865–1866, shortly after moving to Davenport. Boyle moved to a farm north of the city in 1877. He died in 1895.

Architecture
The Boyle House was typical of Davenport's Italianate houses while at the same time it made its own personal architectural statement. The two-story brick structure was built on a stone foundation. It featured a square form, a shallow roof, and bracketed eaves. The door and window treatments were what made this a unique dwelling. Here it featured segmental and Tudor arches along with openings with chamfered corners. There was a small projecting bay on the west side of the house with flat arches. It also had a front porch that had been removed at some point.

References

Houses completed in 1866
Italianate architecture in Iowa
Houses in Davenport, Iowa
Houses on the National Register of Historic Places in Iowa
National Register of Historic Places in Davenport, Iowa
1866 establishments in Iowa